Crash Karma is a Canadian alternative rock supergroup consisting of lead singer Edwin (of I Mother Earth), Mike Turner (formerly of Our Lady Peace), Jeff Burrows (of The Tea Party), and Amir Epstein of Zygote.

History
Crash Karma was founded when Edwin, Epstein and Turner came together in 2008. Burrows was recruited soon after. The band's first full live concert was held in Burlington, Ontario on June 20, 2009. Their first single "Awake" was self-released in July, 2009. Their self-titled debut album was produced by founding member Mike Turner and was released in March, 2010.

In 2013, the band released an album, Rock Musique Deluxe, and was featured on CHCH Television's program Live Music.  They then went on tour in support of the album.

Band members 

Current
 Edwin – lead vocals (2008–present)
 Mike Turner – guitar, backing vocals (2008–present)
 Amir Epstein – bass guitar, backing vocals (2008–present)
 Jeff Burrows – drums, percussion (2008–present)

Discography

Studio albums
 Crash Karma (2010) - No. 38 (CAN)
 Rock Musique Deluxe (2013)

Singles

References

External links
http://www.myspace.com/crashkarma Myspace
http://www.crashkarma.com/ Crash Karma - Official Site

Musical groups established in 2008
Musical groups from Toronto
Canadian alternative rock groups
2008 establishments in Ontario